Rebecca Newman (born 1981) is an English soprano singer and songwriter. She came to prominence in the UK music scene in September 2014 when her debut chart album Dare to Dream went to number 1 in the Official UK Classical Artists Album Chart.

Dubbed 'The People's Soprano' by her fans, colleagues and the media, and following several years as an operatic street performer, she has sung with Aled Jones, Russell Watson, Alfie Boe, Blake, and Joseph Calleja and appeared on UK national television and radio.

Early life
Newman was born and raised in Exmouth, Devon, where she remained until she was 21. She began singing at the age of 13 and twice during her teenage years won a place with the National Youth Music Theatre. In 2002 she moved to London to pursue a career in business, and then moved to York, North Yorkshire in 2004, to read Philosophy, Politics and Economics at the University of York, graduating in 2007. During her time there she began busking and accepting professional engagements. She has remained resident in York, UK.

Music career

Career beginnings
Newman released her first CD album in September 2005, which she recorded on location at the University of York's Jack Lyons Concert Hall.
She went on to release four more studio albums selling over 15,000 copies before her debut chart-eligible album release in 2014. She also performed at many prestigious venues including Glasgow Royal Concert Hall, The Royal Hall in Harrogate and Headingley Stadium. 
In 2013, Newman performed with Aled Jones at Truro Cathedral and Russell Watson at the Party in the Park in Burton Agnes, and performed the national anthems live on international television for three Rugby League World Cup matches. Newman also co-wrote and recorded the official song for the Rugby League World Cup Dance Project, Pass It On.
In November 2013, she released a charity single version of Wonderful Dream, originally released by the late singer Melanie Thornton.
Over the years, Newman built up a loyal following of supporters, who dub themselves The Newmaneers.

Dare to Dream 2014–15
In early 2013 she engaged the services of the City of Prague Philharmonic Orchestra, conductor and arranger Paul Bateman, orchestral producer James Fitzpatrick and producer Gareth Ellis Williams to help create her new album.
The title track, Dare to Dream, was co-written by Newman, Chris Nicolaides and Mike Brayn. The album was released on her own record label, Rambling Rose Records, on 14 September 2014 and it went straight to number one in the Official UK Classical Artists Albums Chart. It received rave reviews
and quickly sold out online and in HMV stores Following the chart success, Newman embarked on a fifty-plus date tour with Russell Watson, as his special guest, performing to over 50,000 people from March to July 2015, followed by a duet with tenor Alfie Boe during the final concert of his summer tour.

Television and radio
Since 2005, Newman has appeared extensively on BBC regional radio and commercial radio stations, among them BBC Radio Bristol and BBC Radio Norfolk. She first appeared on BBC One's Songs of Praise in November 2014, performing The Prayer with the vocal group Blake, and again in May 2015 singing Abide with Me as a solo performance in Manchester Cathedral. The broadcast of the final round of the BBC Radio 2 Young Chorister of the Year competition in St Paul's Cathedral featured the special guests, Newman with Blake, in live performance, and on the Radio 2 Weekend Wogan show she was interviewed by Sir Terry and performed live on air.

Charity
Newman has worked extensively with charities including directly fundraising for ChildLine and for the Royal National Lifeboat Institute, whose Coast to Coast tour in 2012 earned her the RNLI Award for Outstanding Achievement. She has recently become the patron for Socks and Chocs, a West Midlands based homeless outreach charity.She has performed for fundraising events for many charities and community organisations, including The Royal British Legion. and Tumaini Jipya. In June 2017 she joined Joseph Calleja in a gala charity evening at the Victoria and Albert Museum in support of the Inle Trust.

Discography

Albums
 2005: Music Box
 2008: Cantare
 2009: Memory
 2010: O Holy Night
 2011: Fields of Gold
 2014: Dare to Dream (UK Classical Artist Albums Chart No.1)

Singles
 2012: "Il Mio Cuore Va"
 2013: "Pass It On"
 2013: "Heroes to the World"
 2013: "Holidays Are Coming (Wonderful Dream)"
 2014: "Heroes to the World – The People's Anthem"

References

External links
Rebecca Newman official website
BBC1 Songs of Praise: The Prayer 16/11/2014
BBC1 Songs of Praise: Abide with Me 24/5/2015
 BBC Radio 2: Weekend Wogan, 19/7/2015
Ad-lib duet with Alfie Boe – Leeds Millenium Square 24/7/2015
Rebecca Newman's YouTube channel

1981 births
Living people
British sopranos
Opera crossover singers
British women singer-songwriters
English buskers
People from Exmouth
21st-century English women singers
21st-century English singers